The Justice Erima Harvey Northcroft Tokyo War Crimes Trial Collection is an archival collection held at the Macmillan Brown Library of Canterbury University based on the personal papers of Sir Erima Harvey Northcroft, one of the eleven judges on the International Military Tribunal for the Far East. It is notable because in 2009 it was included as one of three New Zealand entries on the UNESCO Memory of the World Register. 

A comprehensive finding aid has been published. Most of the collection is in the form of bound volumes of news-print quality documents.

References 

Libraries in Christchurch
University of Canterbury
International Military Tribunal for the Far East
World War II documents
Memory of the World Register in New Zealand
Archives in New Zealand